Adil Akif oglu Naghiyev (born 11 September 1995) is an Azerbaijani professional footballer who plays as a defender for Azerbaijan Premier League side Sabail FK.

Career
On 27 December 2018, Naghiyev signed for Sumgayit FK.

On 9 August 2019, Naghiyev signed for Sabail FK on a one-year contract.

International
On 26 May 2016 Naghiyev made his senior international debut for Azerbaijan friendly match against Andorra.

Career statistics

Club

International

Statistics accurate as of match played 26 May 2016

Honours

International
Azerbaijan U23
 Islamic Solidarity Games: (1) 2017

References

External links
 

1995 births
Living people
Association football defenders
Azerbaijani footballers
Azerbaijan international footballers
Azerbaijan under-21 international footballers
Azerbaijan youth international footballers
Azerbaijan Premier League players
AZAL PFK players
Zira FK players
Sumgayit FK players
Sabail FK players
Footballers from Baku